Abgarmak-e Olya may refer to:
 Abgarmak-e Olya, Besharat, a village in Besharat District, Aligudarz County, Lorestan Province, Iran
 Abgarmak-e Olya, Zaz va Mahru, a village in Zaz va Mahru District, Aligudarz County, Lorestan Province, Iran